Robert Hampton "Hammy" Gray, RCNVR (November 2, 1917 – August 9, 1945) was a Canadian naval officer, pilot, and recipient of the Victoria Cross (VC) during World War II, one of only two members of the Royal Navy's Fleet Air Arm to have been thus decorated in that war. (The other was Eugene Esmonde, a British pilot.) Gray is the second to last Canadian to be awarded the Victoria Cross.

Early life
Gray was born in Trail, British Columbia, Canada, but resided from an early age in Nelson, where his father was a jeweller. Originally sent to England for training, Gray was sent back to Canada to train at RCAF Station Kingston.

War service

Africa and Norway
Gray initially joined 757 Naval Air Squadron at Winchester, England. He was then assigned to the African theatre, flying Hawker Hurricanes for shore-based squadrons, nos. 795, 803, and 877, where he spent two years at Nairobi.

On August 29, 1944, he was Mentioned in Dispatches for his participation in an attack on three German destroyers, during which his plane's rudder was shot off. On January 16, 1945, he received a further Mention, "For undaunted courage, skill and determination in carrying out daring attacks on the German battleship Tirpitz."

Japan
In April 1945, HMS Formidable joined the British Pacific Fleet which was involved in the invasion of Okinawa. By July 1945, the carrier was involved in strikes on the Japanese mainland. On July 18, Gray led a strafing mission against airfields in the Tokyo area. On July 24, Gray led another flight to the inland sea which damaged one merchant ship, and damaged two seaplane bases and one airbase. Gray earned a Distinguished Service Cross for aiding in sinking a Japanese destroyer in the area of Tokyo on July 28. The award was not announced until August 21, 1945, when the notice appeared in the London Gazette with the citation, "For determination and address in air attacks on targets in Japan".

VC action
On August 9, 1945, at Onagawa Bay, Miyagi Prefecture, Japan, Lieutenant Gray (flying a Vought F4U Corsair) led an attack on a group of Japanese naval vessels, sinking the   before his plane crashed into the bay. The citation for his VC, gazetted on November 13, 1945, described as being:

Gray was one of the last Canadians to die during World War II, and was the second to last Canadian to be awarded the Victoria Cross, the last being that of Pilot Officer Andrew Mynarski, awarded a year later in relation to an incident that occurred before Gray's. His VC is owned by the Gray family.

Awards and decorations
Gray's personal awards and decorations include the following:

Legacy

As Gray's remains were never found, he was listed as missing in action and presumed dead. He is commemorated, with other Canadians who died or were buried at sea during the First and Second World Wars, at the Halifax Memorial in Point Pleasant Park, Halifax, Nova Scotia. The War Memorial Gym at University of British Columbia, Royal Canadian Legion hall in Nelson, numerous other sites in Nelson, and the wardroom of HMCS Tecumseh (his RCNVR home unit) also bear plaques in his honour.

A memorial for Gray was erected at Onagawa Bay in 1989 in Sakiyama Park. This is the only memorial dedicated to a foreign soldier on Japanese soil. Following the devastation of the March 11, 2011 earthquake (during which the granite monument itself was knocked over), the monument (with new plaque) was moved from its original location in Sakiyama Park to one beside the hospital (Onagawacho Community Medicine Center) in Onagawa Town. A rededication ceremony was held August 24, 2012. Gray is one of fourteen figures commemorated at the Valiants Memorial in Ottawa.

To celebrate the Centennial of the Canadian Navy, during the 2010 air show season, Vintage Wings of Canada flew at events across Canada in a Corsair bearing the markings of the plane Gray was likely flying that fateful day.

His life is recorded in A Formidable Hero: Lt. R.H. Gray, VC, DSC, RCNVR by Stuart E. Soward, published by Trafford Neptune.

Grays Peak, British Columbia
On March 12, 1946, the Geographic Board of Canada named a mountain in Kokanee Glacier Provincial Park, British Columbia, after Gray and his brother, Flt Sgt John Balfour Gray, RCAF, who was also killed in World War II.

Hampton Gray Memorial Elementary
The elementary school at CFB Shearwater is named after Gray.

Kingston Norman Rogers Airport
Gray completed his training at No. 31 Service Flying Training School in Kingston, Ontario. There is a Harvard aircraft, same type of trainer he flew at Kingston, mounted on a pedestal with a memorial dedicated to him. Additionally, the road leading to the airport terminal has been named Hampton Gray Gate.

Royal Canadian Sea Cadets 
The Royal Canadian Sea Cadet Corps in Nelson, BC is named 81 Hampton Gray, VC Royal Canadian Sea Cadet Corps.

Royal Canadian Air Cadets 
In 2012, the Royal Canadian Air Cadets created a new squadron in his honour called 789 Lt. R. Hampton Gray VC Squadron which is located in Mississauga, Ontario.

Harry DeWolf-class offshore patrol vessel 

The sixth  for the Royal Canadian Navy will be named for Gray.

References

External links
 
 
 
 Vintage Wings of Canada article on Gray

1917 births
1945 deaths
Aviators killed by being shot down
Royal Canadian Navy officers
Canadian World War II recipients of the Victoria Cross
Canadian military personnel killed in World War II
Fleet Air Arm aviators
People from Trail, British Columbia
Canadian recipients of the Distinguished Service Cross (United Kingdom)
University of British Columbia alumni
Fleet Air Arm personnel of World War II
Missing in action of World War II
Canadian military personnel from British Columbia
Royal Canadian Navy personnel of World War II